The 2014 Volta a Catalunya was the 94th running of the Volta a Catalunya cycling stage race. It started on 24 March in Calella and ended on 30 March in Barcelona, and consisted of seven stages. It was the fifth race of the 2014 UCI World Tour season.

Rodríguez won the general classification by four seconds over runner-up and compatriot Alberto Contador, while the 's Tejay van Garderen completed the podium, three seconds behind Contador, and seven down on Rodríguez; van Garderen was the winner of the race's queen stage to Vallter 2000-Setcases on the fourth day.

In the race's other classifications, Stef Clement, of the  team, was the winner of the red jersey for the mountains classification; he also won a stage wearing the jersey, winning on the penultimate stage.  rider Michel Koch won both sprints classifications; along with the normal intermediate sprints, Koch was the winner of the special sprints standings, named in honour of Miguel Poblet, with the most points at the specific sprint places on the itinerary. For the second year in a row,  won the teams classification.

Route

Teams
As the Volta a Catalunya was a UCI World Tour event, all 18 UCI ProTeams were invited automatically and obligated to send a squad. Four other squads were given wildcard places, thus completing the 22-team peloton.

The 22 teams that competed in the race were:

Stages

Stage 1
24 March 2014 — Calella to Calella,

Stage 2
25 March 2014 — Mataró to Girona,

Stage 3
26 March 2014 — Banyoles to La Molina,

Stage 4
27 March 2014 — Alp to Vallter 2000-Setcases,

Stage 5
28 March 2014 — Llanars to Valls,

Stage 6
29 March 2014 — El Vendrell to Vilanova i la Geltrú,

Stage 7
30 March 2014 — Barcelona to Barcelona,

Classification leadership table
In the 2014 Volta a Catalunya, four different jerseys were awarded. For the general classification, calculated by adding each cyclist's finishing times on each stage, and allowing time bonuses in intermediate sprints and at the finish in mass-start stages, the leader received a white and green jersey. This classification was considered the most important of the 2014 Volta a Catalunya, and the winner of the classification was considered the winner of the race.

Additionally, there was a sprints classification, which awarded a white jersey. In the sprints classification, cyclists received points for finishing in the top 3 at intermediate sprint points during each stage; these intermediate sprints also offered bonus seconds towards the general classification. A special sprints classification was also contested, with points on offer at a specific point during the stage; the classification was named in honour of former cyclist Miguel Poblet, who died in 2013. There was also a mountains classification, the leadership of which was marked by a red jersey. In the mountains classification, points were won by reaching the top of a climb before other cyclists, with more points available for the higher-categorised climbs.

There was also a classification for teams, in which the times of the best three cyclists per team on each stage were added together; the leading team at the end of the race was the team with the lowest total time.

References

External links
 

Volta a Catalunya
Volta a Catalunya
Volta a Catalunya by year
2014 in Catalan sport
March 2014 sports events in Europe